Plains coreopsis, garden tickseed, golden tickseed,
 or calliopsis, Coreopsis tinctoria, is an annual forb.  The plant is common in Canada (from Quebec to British Columbia), northeast Mexico (Coahuila, Nuevo León, Tamaulipas), and much of the United States, especially the Great Plains and Southern states where it is often called "calliopsis." The species is also widely cultivated and naturalized in China.

It often grows in disturbed areas such as roadsides and cultivated fields.

Description

Its leaves are pinnately-divided, glabrous and tend to thin at the top of the plant where numerous  flower heads sit atop slender stems.

Flower heads are brilliant yellow with maroon or brown disc florets of various sizes. Flowering typically occurs in mid-summer.  The small, slender seeds germinate in fall (overwintering as a low rosette) or early spring. Ray florets have notched tips. Its native habitats include prairie, plains, meadows, pastures, savannas, roadsides, and pond banks. The Latin specific epithet tinctoria refers to its use in dyeing.

Uses
The Zuni people traditionally use the blossoms of the tinctoria variety to make a mahogany red dye for yarn, and, until the introduction of coffee by traders, to make a hot beverage. Women also used an infusion of the whole plant of this variety, except for the root, if they desired a female child.

Cultivation

Plains coreopsis is cultivated as an ornamental plant for gardens, and as a native plant for wildlife gardens and natural landscaping. It grows well in many types of soil, but seems to prefer sandy or well-drained soils. Although somewhat drought-tolerant, naturally growing plants are usually found in areas with regular rainfall. Preferring full sun, it will also grow in partial shade.

Cultivars
Because of its easy growing habits and the bright, showy flowers of cultivars such as 'Roulette' (tiger stripes of gold on a deep mahogany ground), plains coreopsis is increasingly used for landscape beautification and in flower gardens.

References

External links

United States Department of Agriculture Plant Conservation Service: Coreopsis tinctoria
Oklahoma State University, Forest & Pasture Management

tinctoria
Flora of North America
Garden plants of North America
Plants described in 1821
Plant dyes
Plants used in Native American cuisine
Plants used in traditional Native American medicine